The Qimei Power Plant is a fuel-fired power plant in Nangang Village, Cimei Township, Penghu County, Taiwan. It is the only power plant on Cimei Island.

History
On 20 June 1974, Taiwan Power Company took over a power plant currently operating on the island with a capacity of 2x120 kW. The plant only powered up to a maximum 10 hours per day only. In 1978, the power plant was rebuilt at the current site with a generation capacity of 500 kW using diesel engine. The plant was then able to supply around 13–16 hours of electricity per day to the local residents. In 1981, three units of 500 kW generator were added to the plant to increase its generation capacity. Starting 1 February 1984, the power plant could supply electricity to the local residents for 24 hours a day. Over the years due to the growing demand, the installed 4 units of 500 kW generator became insufficient to keep supplying electricity. Thus, in 1998, 2001 and 2006, the power plant was overhauled to replace its generator from 500 kW to 1,000 kW capacity.

See also

 List of power stations in Taiwan
 Electricity sector in Taiwan

References

1974 establishments in Taiwan
Buildings and structures in Penghu County
Energy infrastructure completed in 1974
Oil-fired power stations in Taiwan